Séléna Janicijevic (born 23 July 2002) is a French tennis player.
On 31 October 2022, she reached a new career-high of world No. 182 in singles.
Janicijevic has won seven singles and one doubles titles on the ITF Women’s Circuit.

She has a career-high combined ranking of No. 18 on the ITF Junior Circuit, achieved on 27 February 2020.

Career

Early years
Janicijevic started playing tennis at the age of six and prefers clay courts. She played primarily in tournaments on the ITF Women's World Tennis Tour and the ITF Junior Circuit.

2019: Grand Slam debut
Janicijevic made her Grand Slam main-draw debut at the 2019 French Open after receiving a wildcard for the singles main draw and also for the doubles main draw, partnering Aubane Droguet.

2022: Finding success in the Mediterranean
Following the sweet high of the previous year, Janicijevic started her year in the courts of Egypt which brought her the $15k title in Giza in the last week of 2021. In the span of three weeks, she would score two semifinals showing in the first two $15k in Giza and Cairo, stopped only by Sapfo Sakellaridi in both tournaments, and a surprise championship win in the $25k in Cairo which included a win over former doubles world No. 1, Timea Babos. This title was followed by another in February, this time a $15k in Antalya over Angelica Moratelli. However, she would lose the two consequent tournaments on the Turkish clay, one ending in retirement. She did not play for a few weeks after this before returning to the European ITFs where she found minimum success. Upon her return to Egypt, she found herself in a much better position, immediately going to the final of a $25k, losing to Anastasia Zolotareva.

Back in continental Europe, she would participate in several tournaments with the highlights being a Q2 showing at the 2022 French Open, losing a tight match to Irina Bara, and narrowly losing to Magda Linette in the Parisian WTA 125. In the back end of June, Janicijevic managed to clinch a $25k in Perigueux ousting top seed Katharina Hobgarski in the final.

2023: Australian Open debut
She qualified for the 2023 Australian Open to make her debut at this Major.

Grand Slam performance

Singles

Doubles

ITF Circuit finals

Singles: 9 (7 titles, 2 runner-ups)

Doubles: 1 (title)

References

External links
 
 

2002 births
Living people
French female tennis players
Sportspeople from Nogent-sur-Marne
French people of Serbian descent